Şilan Ayyıldız (born 10 October 1999) is a Turkish female middle and long-distance track runner, who is specialized in the 800 m and 1500 m events.

Private life 
Şilan Ayyıldız was born to İhsan Ayyıldız and his wife Şazide on 10 October 1999. She has a brother Recep and a sister Dilan.

She finished the Atatürk Çağdaş Yaşam Anatolian  High school in Istanbul. After graduation, she received  scholarship offers from Utah Valley University, University of Alabama, Mississippi State University and George Washington University. She is a student at Koç University in Istanbul. She is a member of Beşiktaş J.K. Athletics.

Sports career 
Ayyıldız began running in the high school. She set a school record in 800 m with 2:09 and in 1500 m with 4:26.9. She took part at the ISF World Schools Championship Athletics 2017 in Nancy, France on 24-20 June, where she took the silver medal in the 800 m event.

She gained her first international experience in 2017, when she was eliminated from the preliminary round of the 1500 m event at the 2017 European Athletics U20 Championships in Grosseto ,Italy on 20-23 July with a time of 4:35.96. That year in October, she took part in the 800 m event at the International Arhletcis Championship held in  Lefkoşa, Northern Cyprus. The following year, she won the U20 1500 m at the Balkan Athletics Indoor Championships in Istanbul in 4:37.21, and took the silver medal in the U20 800 m in 2:11.36. In 2021, she finished eleventh at the European Athletics U23 Championships in Tallinn, Estonia with 4:19.63 over 1500 m, and was eliminated 800 m with 2:16.86 min in the preliminary heat.

In April 2021, Ayyıldız won the 10 km maraton at the N Kolay International Marathon in Istanbul with 37.17 , and in June 2022, she became Turkish U-23 champion in the 1500 m event in Bursa.

In 2022, she won with 4:12.78 over 1500 m at the Balkan Athletics Indoor Championships in Istanbul, and also at the outdoor championships in Craiova, Romania, she secured the gold medal in 4:17.27, and her team finished there the 4 × 400 m relay event in fourth place with 3:42.42. In June 2022, she improved her "personal best" in the 1500 m with a time of 4:10.59 at the Meeting International D'athlétisme de Montreuil in France organized by the European Athletic Association, and won the 1500 m in 4:12.69 at the Motonet Grand Prix Espoo 2022 in Finland. She finished fifth at the 2022 Mediterranean Games in Oran, Algeria with a time of 4:14.45, and then dropped out of the first round at the 2022 World Athletics Championships in Eugene, Oregon, USA with a time of 4:12.67. In August 2022, she placed fourth in the 800 m event at the Islamic Solidarity Games in Konya, Turkey with a time of 2:04.76, and finished the 1500 m event in fifth place with 4:19.79.

References

External links 
 * 
 * Şilan Ayyıldız at European Athletics
 

1999 births
Living people
Koç University alumni
Turkish female middle-distance runners
Turkish female long-distance runners
Beşiktaş J.K. athletes
Mediterranean Games competitors for Turkey